Matka may refer to:

Places
Matka, Estonia, a village in Lüganuse Parish, Ida-Viru County, Estonia
Matka Canyon, a canyon in the Republic of North Macedonia
Matka, Raebareli, a village in Uttar Pradesh, India
Matka, Saraj, a village in Saraj Municipality, Republic of North Macedonia

Other
Matka (silk), a type of silk fabric in ancient India
Matka gambling, a type of betting and lottery
Matka-class missile boat, a group of hydrofoil missile boats built for the Soviet Navy
Matki (earthen pot)
Ghatam, a percussion instrument
Mother (opera), a 1929 quarter-tone opera by Alois Hába
The Mother (Čapek play), a 1938 play by Karel Čapek

See also